R. W. (Walter) L. Moberly (born 26 March 1952) is an English theologian and professor of theology and biblical interpretation at Durham University.

He was awarded an M.A. at Oxford and both an M.A., Ph.D. Cambridge, UK. He is also an ordained priest in the Church of England.

Moberly is the great nephew of Professor Sir Walter Hamilton Moberly. Like his great uncle he was educated at Winchester College and at New College, Oxford.

Works

Books

Articles & chapters

References

External links
Walter Moberly's profile

English theologians
1952 births
Living people
Academics of Durham University
Alumni of the University of Oxford
Alumni of the University of Cambridge
Presidents of the Society for Old Testament Study